HMS E1 (laid down as HMS D9) was a British E-class submarine that was built by Chatham Dockyard and cost £101,700. E1 was laid down on 14 February 1911. She was launched on 9 November 1912 and was commissioned on 6 May 1913. During World War I she was part of the British submarine flotilla in the Baltic.

Design 

The early 'Group 1' E class boats were armed with four 18 inch (450 mm) torpedo tubes, one in the bow, one either side amidships, and one in the stern; a total of eight torpedoes were carried. Group 1 boats were not fitted with a deck gun during construction, but those involved in the Dardanelles campaign had guns mounted forward of the conning tower while at Malta Dockyard.

E-Class submarines had wireless systems with  power ratings; in some submarines, these were later upgraded to  systems by removing a midship torpedo tube. Their maximum design depth was  although in service some reached depths of below . Some submarines contained Fessenden oscillator systems.

Crew 
Her complement was three officers and 28 men.

Service history 
E1 joined the 8th Submarine Flotilla, based at Portsmouth on commissioning.

Then on 15 October 1914, she and  sailed from Gorleston in a successful attempt to penetrate the German defences and enter the Baltic. On 18 October 1914, E1 unsuccessfully attacked the armoured cruiser  in Kiel Bay. The torpedo ran too deep and missed. On 22 July 1915, E1 fired two torpedoes at the German Vorpostenboot (or patrol boat) Neumühlen, which missed. On 30 July 1915, she torpedoed and sank the German auxilary minesweeper Aachen east-northeast of Östergarn, Gotland, Sweden. On 19 August 1915, she torpedoed and damaged the German battlecruiser  (23,000 tons) during the Battle of the Gulf of Riga.

Notes

References 
 

 
 
 
 E 1 in hylyt.net 
 Finnish Submarines in Finnish Navy in World War II

 

British E-class submarines of the Royal Navy
Ships built in Chatham
1912 ships
World War I submarines of the United Kingdom
World War I shipwrecks in the Baltic Sea
Royal Navy ship names
Maritime incidents in 1918
Shipwrecks of Finland
Scuttled vessels of the United Kingdom